Banco Paris was a bank in Chile.

Overview
It was created in 2004 with the Santiago Express division of Banco Santander-Chile. Horst Paulmann, the CEO of Cencosud, sits on the Board of Directors.

References

External links
Official website

Banks of Chile
Banks established in 2004
2004 establishments in Chile